Šid railway station is a railway station on Belgrade–Šid, first on Bijeljina–Šid railway and railway junction. Located in Šid, Serbia. Railroad continues to Tovarnik in one direction, in another direction to Kukujevci-Erdevik, and a third direction towards to Sremska Rača. Šid railway station consists of 10 railway track.

Gallery

In popular culture 
In 1965 novel Garden, Ashes by Yugoslav author Danilo Kiš, Eduard Scham, father of the main character Andreas Scham, continued his life as the railway clerk at the Šid Railway Station following his personal bankruptcy.

See also 
 Serbian Railways

References 

Šid
Railway stations in Vojvodina